West-Oak High School was created by the consolidation of Oakway and Westminster High Schools. The school serves students from approximately one-half of the land area in Oconee County, South Carolina. Both Oakway and Westminster schools had been previously consolidated in the 1960s with Fair Play, and Cleveland community schools. Construction for the new building began in 1982, students entered in the fall of 1983, and the first class graduated in the spring of 1984.

Athletics 
The mascot at West Oak is the Warrior.

Wrestling 
The Warrior Wrestlers won the 2015 AAA title.

Then in 2017 and 2018 they won the state championship.

Expansion

During the 2010–2011 school year, budgets were given to each school in the Oconee County district. West-Oak used theirs to add onto their school by adding a brand new entrance with new offices as well as a complete new two-story building for more classrooms to be added on. A new lunchroom expansion was also added with new glass walls and several new features.

Notable alumni
 Jared Burton, Major League Baseball pitcher
 Andy Lee, football punter for Arizona Cardinals and Carolina Panthers of National Football League

References

External links
 

Educational institutions established in 1983
Public high schools in South Carolina
Schools in Oconee County, South Carolina
1983 establishments in South Carolina